FabricLive.27 is a DJ mix album by DJ Format, recorded as part of the FabricLive albums and released on the Fabric label in April 2006.

Track listing
  DJ Format - 33% B-Boy - [PIAS]
  Ugly Duckling - U.D. in Brasil - Ugly Duckling
  Lyrics Born - Do That There - Quannum Projects
  DJ Format Ft. Abdominal & D-Sisive - 3 ft Deep - [PIAS]
  Cut Chemist & This Kid Named Miles - SNT (Live at the Peace Pipe '93) - Kick Snare Hat
  Coldcut - Beats & Pieces - Ahead of Our Time/Big Life
  Aspects - Bristol Fingers - Aspects TV
  Jimmy Smith - Root Down and Get It - UMG
  Mr. Lif Ft. Edan - Get Wise '91 - Definitive Jux
  Nostalgia 77 - Changes - Tru Thoughts
  Ella Fitzgerald - Sunshine of Your Love - Universal Classics and Jazz
  Marsha Hunt - Hot Rod Poppa - Track
  Reverend Cleatus & the Soul Saviours - The Slip - Freestyle
  Nina Simone - Save Me - BMG
  Julie Driscoll, Brian Auger and the Trinity - Indian Rope Man - Polydor
  Julian Covey & the Machine - Sweet Bacon - Island
  We the People - Breakdown - Davel Music
  Ellen McIlwaine - Toe Hold (Live at the Bitter End, New York) - Mercury
  Karachi Prison Band - Put Some Grit In It - Magnetic Fields
  Ruff Francis & the Illusions - Give Me Mercy - Essica
  Linda Perry & the Soul Express / Eddie Billups - I Need Someone - Mainstream
  John Murtaugh - Slinky - Polydor
  Ananda Shankar - Dancing Drums - Saregama
  Cleo Laine - Night Owl - Newquay
  Edan Ft. Dagha - Rock and Roll - Lewis

External links
 Fabric: FabricLive.27

Live
DJ Format albums
2006 compilation albums